Casmena incerta is a species of leaf beetle of Senegal, described by Maurice Pic in 1951.

References

Eumolpinae
Beetles of Africa
Taxa named by Maurice Pic
Beetles described in 1951
Insects of West Africa
Endemic fauna of Senegal